Domokos Kosáry ([ˈdomokoʃ ˈkoʃaːri], 31 July 1913 – 15 November 2007) was a Hungarian historian and writer who served as president of the Hungarian Academy of Sciences from 1990 until 1996.

Biography 
Kosáry was born in Selmecbánya (Banská Štiavnica) and opposed the German occupation and collaboration with Hungary during World War II. He lost influence in Hungary after the war due to the Communist takeover of the country for being too "bourgeois". He was imprisoned for his opposition to Communism following the failed Hungarian Revolution of 1956.

Kosáry was unanimously elected president of the Hungarian Academy of Sciences (HAS) in 1990 and was re-elected to a second three-year term in 1993. He led the effort to introduce newer, more democratic bye laws at the Hungarian Academy of Sciences. The new laws governing the HAS were enacted by the Parliament of Hungary in 1994.

Kosáry died in Budapest on 15 November 2007 at the age of 95.

Selected works

A History of Hungary (as Dominic G. Kosary), Benjamin Franklin Bibliophile Society, 1941.
Napoleon et la Hongrie, Akademiai Kiado Budapest, 1979
The Press During the Hungarian Revoluton of l848-1849, East European Monographs, 1987
Culture and Society in Eighteenth Century Hungary, Corvina, 1987.
Hungary and International Politics in 1848-1849, East European Monographs, 2003

References

External links 
The Guardian: Domokos Kosáry, The pre-eminent Hungarian historian of the 20th century
Hungarian Academy of Sciences: Former HAS President Dies at 95

1913 births
2007 deaths
20th-century Hungarian historians
Hungarian people of World War II
Historians of Hungary
Members of the Hungarian Academy of Sciences